The voiceless retroflex flap or tap is a sound that has been reported to occur as a dialectal realization of  in the Dhivehi language.

Features
Features of the voiceless retroflex flap:

Occurrence

Notes

References

External links
 

Retroflex consonants
Tap and flap consonants
Pulmonic consonants
Voiceless oral consonants
Central consonants